"Numb" is a song by American record producer Marshmello and American singer-songwriter Khalid. It was released as a single through Republic and Joytime Collective as a single on June 10, 2022. The song was produced by Marshmello and Digital Farm Animals, who both wrote it alongside Khalid, Richard Boardman and Pablo Bowman of the songwriting collective the Six, and Aldae. It marks the second collaboration between the two artists, following Marshmello's 2017 single, "Silence".

Background
Marshmello and Khalid both spoke about "Numb" in a statement. Marshmello said: "Me and Khalid always talked about doing another song, so I sent this idea to him and he loved it. I was super happy when I asked him if he wanted to do the song and he said yes because the song is a little different vibe for him, but I knew he would crush it. He sent it to me the next day and I immediately knew we had one with this". Khalid said: "Mello and I have a great friendship, and when we get together to make music, it's always great vibes. 'Silence' is a fan favorite that I love performing, so continuing our collaborations with 'Numb' is something that I'm looking forward to".

Composition and lyrics
"Numb" is a deep house song that includes a four on the floor rhythmic pattern rather than a contemporary pop-trap style, which was shown on Marshmello and Khalid's previous collaboration on "Silence". It also contains "uplifting pop dance riffs, a pumping house groove, and sultry vocals from Khalid". The song leans into Marshmello's usual melodic sound that also contains "intoxicating backbeats", which let Khalid's vocals take center stage.

Release and promotion
On May 12, 2022, Marshmello tweeted that him and Khalid needed to work together on another song. He teased the song exactly two weeks later. After both artists posted a few snippets of the song, they announced the song on June 3, 2022.

Music video
The official music video for "Numb" premiered alongside the release of the song on Marshmello's YouTube channel on June 10, 2022. It starts with Khalid singing while sitting next to a record player before the scene transitions to a house party that includes a pool, in which a lot of women later show up. Joe Price of Complex felt that the video was perfect for the vibe of the song and was reminded of the video for "Silence", in which he concluded that the video for "Numb" shows their collaborative history.

Credits and personnel
 Marshmello – production, songwriting
 Khalid – vocals, songwriting
 Digital Farm Animals – production, songwriting
 Richard Boardman – songwriting
 Pablo Bowman – songwriting
 Aldae – songwriting
 Manny Marroquin – mixing
 Michelle Mancini – mastering
 Denis Kosiak – engineering
 Anthony Vilchis – engineering assistance
 Zach Pereyra – engineering assistance

Charts

Weekly charts

Year-end charts

Certifications

Release history

References

2022 singles
2022 songs
Republic Records singles
Marshmello songs
Songs written by Marshmello
Khalid (singer) songs
Songs written by Khalid (singer)
Songs written by Digital Farm Animals
Song recordings produced by Digital Farm Animals
Deep house songs